Carex pertenuis is a tussock-forming species of perennial sedge in the family Cyperaceae. It is native to southern parts of Mexico and northern parts of Central America.

See also
List of Carex species

References

pertenuis
Taxa named by Liberty Hyde Bailey
Plants described in 1889
Flora of Mexico
Flora of Guatemala